Raccoon City is an unincorporated community located in Pike County, Kentucky, United States.

The community was so named on account of raccoons near the original town site.

Climate
The climate in this area is characterized by relatively high temperatures and evenly distributed precipitation throughout the year.  The Köppen Climate System describes the weather as humid subtropical, and uses the abbreviation Cfa.

References

Unincorporated communities in Pike County, Kentucky
Unincorporated communities in Kentucky